CATOBAR ("Catapult Assisted Take-Off But Arrested Recovery" or "Catapult Assisted Take-Off Barrier Arrested Recovery") is a system used for the launch and recovery of aircraft from the deck of an aircraft carrier. Under this technique, aircraft launch using a catapult-assisted take-off and land on the ship (the recovery phase) using arrestor wires.

Although this system is costlier than alternative methods, it provides greater flexibility in carrier operations, since it imposes less onerous design elements on fixed wing aircraft than alternative methods of launch and recovery such as STOVL or STOBAR, allowing for a greater payload for more ordnance and/or fuel. CATOBAR can launch aircraft that lack a high thrust to weight ratio, including heavier non-fighter aircraft such as the E-2 Hawkeye and Grumman C-2 Greyhound.

Types

The catapult system in use in modern CATOBAR carriers is the steam catapult. Its primary advantage is the amount of power and control it can provide. During World War II the US Navy used a hydraulic catapult.

The United States Navy has developed a system to launch carrier-based aircraft from catapults using a linear motor drive instead of steam, called the EMALS.

Current users
Only two states currently operate carriers that use the CATOBAR system following the decommissioning of Brazil's NAe São Paulo in February 2017; the U.S. with its Nimitz-class and Gerald R. Ford-class and France with its Charles De Gaulle.

U.S. Navy Gerald R. Ford-class carriers will use the EMALS electromagnetic aircraft launch system in place of steam catapults.

Active CATOBAR aircraft carrier classes

CATOBAR carriers under construction

Potential users
The Chinese Fujian (Type 003), currently under construction at the Jiangnan Shipyard, will feature an integrated electric propulsion system that will allow the operation of electromagnetic catapults, similar to the Electromagnetic Aircraft Launch System (EMALS) used by the United States Navy.

INS Vishal, India's second indigenous aircraft carrier of the Vikrant-class, is planned to be of 65,000 ton displacement and to utilize the EMALS catapults developed by General Atomics, as it supports heavier fighters, AEW aircraft and UCAVs that cannot launch using a STOBAR ski jump ramps.

See also
 List of all aircraft carriers

References

Aircraft carriers
Naval aviation technology
Types of take-off and landing